Louis-Marie Régis  (December 8, 1903 – February 2, 1988) was a Canadian philosopher, medievalist, and Dominican priest. He was the founder of the Institute for Medieval Studies in 1942 and served as its director from 1943 until 1952. In 1971 he was made a Companion of the Order of Canada.

External links
 

1903 births
1988 deaths
20th-century Canadian philosophers
20th-century Canadian Roman Catholic priests
Companions of the Order of Canada
Epistemologists
Catholic philosophers
Thomists